The Ministry of Health, abbreviated MOH, is a ministry of the Government of Malaysia that is responsible for health system: health behaviour, cancer, public health, health management, medical research, health systems research, respiratory medicine, health promotion, healthcare tourism, medical device, blood collection, leprosy control, clinical research, health care, dental care, health institution, laboratory, pharmaceutical, patient safety.

The Minister of Health administers ministerial functions through the Ministry of Health and a range of other government agencies. The current Health Minister is vacant following the resignation of the cabinet on the 16th of August 2021. The minister is assisted by the Deputy Minister of Health.

Its headquarters is located in Putrajaya.

Organisation
 Minister of Health
 Deputy Minister
 Secretary-General
 Under the Authority of Secretary-General
 Development Division
 Policy and International Relations Division
 Legal Advisor Office
 Internal Audit 
 Corporate Communication Unit
 Integrity Unit
 Key Performance Indicator and Empowerment of Bumiputera Economy Unit
 Policy Surveillance Unit
Director-General of Health
 Under the Authority of Director-General of Health
 Johor State Health Department
 Kedah State Health Department
 Kelantan State Health Department
 Kuala Lumpur and Putrajaya Federal Territory Health Department
 Labuan Federal Territory Health Department
 Malacca State Health Department
 Negeri Sembilan State Health Department
 Pahang State Health Department
 Penang State Health Department
 Perak State Health Department
 Perlis State Health Department
 Sabah State Health Department
 Sarawak State Health Department
 Selangor State Health Department
 Terengganu State Health Department
 Deputy Director-General (Public Health)
 Family Health Development Division
 Disease Control Division
 Health Education Division
 Nutrition Division
 Public Health Development Division
 Deputy Director-General (Medical)
 Medical Development Division
 Medical Practice Division
 Allied Health Sciences Division
 Traditional and Complementary Medicine Division
 Nursing Division
 Deputy Director-General (Research and Technical Support)
 Planning Division
 National Institute of Health (NIH)
 Institute for Medical Research (IMR), or Institut Penyelidikan Perubatan. (Official site)
 Institute for Public Health, or Institut Kesihatan Umum (IKU). (Official site)
 Institute for Health Systems Research (IHSR), or Institut Penyelidikan Sistem Kesihatan. (Official site)
 Clinical Research Centre (CRC), or Pusat Penyelidikan Klinikal. (Official site)
 Institute for Health Management (IHM), or Institut Pengurusan Kesihatan. (Official site)
 Institute of Health Behavioural Research, or Insititut Penyelidikan Tingkahlaku Kesihatan (IPTK). (Official site)
 Engineering Services Division
 Medical Radiation Surveillance Division
 Principal Director (Oral Health)
 Oral Health Policy and Strategic Planning Division
 Oral Healthcare Division
 Oral Health Practice and Development Division
 Malaysian Dental Council
 Principal Director (Pharmaceutical Services)
 Pharmacy Enforcement Division
 Pharmacy Practice and Development Division
 Pharmacy Policy and Strategic Planning Division
 Pharmacy Board Malaysia
 National Pharmaceutical Regulatory Agency
 Principal Director (Food Safety and Quality)
 Planning, Policy Development and Codex Standard Division
 Compliance and Industrial Development Division
 Food Analyst Council
 Deputy Secretary-General (Management)
 Human Resources Division
 Training Management Division
 Competency Development Division
 Information Management Division
 Management Services Division
 Deputy Secretary-General (Finance)
 Finance Division
 Procurement and Privatisation Division
 Account Division

Federal agencies
 Children's Dental Centre and Dental Training College Malaysia, or Pusat Pergigian Kanak-Kanak dan Kolej Latihan Pergigian Malaysia (PPKKKLPM). (Official site)
 Malaysian Health Promotion Board, or Lembaga Promosi Kesihatan Malaysia (MySihat). (Official site)
 Medical Device Authority, or Pihak Berkuasa Peranti Perubatan (PBPP). (Official site)
 Malaysia Healthcare Travel Council (MHTC), or  Majlis Pengembaraan Penjagaan Kesihatan Malaysia. (Official site)

Key legislation
The Ministry of Health is responsible for administration of several key Acts: 
 Nurses Act 1950 [Act 14]
 Medical Act 1971 [Act 50]
 Dental Act 1971 [Act 51]
 Human Tissues Act 1974 [Act 130]
 Destruction of Disease-Bearing Insects Act 1975 [Act 154]
 Medical Assistants (Registration) Act 1977 [Act 180]
 Fees Act 1951 [Act 209]
 Dangerous Drugs Act 1952 [Act 234]
 Hydrogen Cyanide (Fumigation) Act 1953 [Act 260]
 Food Act 1983 [Act 281]
 Medicines (Advertisement and Sale) Act 1956 [Act 290]
 Atomic Energy Licensing Act 1984 [Act 304]
 Prevention and Control of Infectious Diseases Act 1988 [Act 342]
 Poisons Act 1952 [Act 366]
 Sale of Drugs Act 1952 [Act 368]
 Registration of Pharmacists Act 1951 [Act 371]
 Estate Hospital Assistants (Registration) Act 1965 [Act 435]
 Midwives Act 1966 [Act 436]
 Optical Act 1991 [Act 469]
 Telemedicine Act 1997 [Act 564] 
 Private Healthcare Facilities and Services Act 1998 [Act 586]
 Mental Health Act 2001 [Act 615]
 Malaysian Health Promotion Board Act 2006 [Act 651]

Policy Priorities of the Government of the Day
 Emergency Medicine and Trauma Services Policy
 Psychiatric and Mental Health Services Operational Policy
 Unrelated Living Organ Donation : Policy and Procedures
 Standards of Sleep Facility in Ministry of Health, Malaysia
 Cardiothoracic Surgery Services Operational Policy
 Departmental Policy of Pathology Services
 Palliative Care Operational Policy
 Nephrology Services Operational Policy
 Operational Policy in Obstetrics and Gynaecology Services
 Policies and Procedures on Infection Control
 Operational Policy, Anaesthesia and Intensive Care Service
 Policy on Resuscitation Training for Ministry of Health Hospitals
 Cochlear Implant Service Operational Policy
 National Organ, Tissue and Cell Transplantation Policy
 Malaysian National Medicines Policy

See also

 Minister of Health (Malaysia)
 National Organ, Tissue and Cell Transplantation Policy in Malaysia

References

External links

 
 

 
Federal ministries, departments and agencies of Malaysia
Malaysian
Ministries established in 1962
1962 establishments in Malaya